Susat is a village in Semikarakorsky District, Rostov Oblast, Russia.

References

Rural localities in Rostov Oblast